Bondola is a wine grape variety grown in the northern part of Ticino, Switzerland. It is mainly used in traditional wines, mainly by small or family wineries, and thus not very widespread in shops and restaurants.

References

Red wine grape varieties 
Culture in Ticino
Swiss wine